David Bloch-Blumenfeld (1880 – 27 November 1947), sometimes simply David Bloch, was one of the leaders of the Labor Zionism movement in Mandate Palestine and mayor of Tel Aviv in 1925–27. Moshav Dovev in northern Israel is named after him.

External links
https://web.archive.org/web/20110721142932/http://www.ahuzatbait.org.il/Index.asp?ArticleID=234&CategoryID=213&Page=1 

1880 births
1947 deaths
Jews from the Russian Empire
Jewish mayors
Jewish socialists
Jews in Mandatory Palestine
Poale Zion politicians
Mayors of Tel Aviv-Yafo
Officers of the Order of the White Lion
Burials at Trumpeldor Cemetery